Christopher Bruce Burns (born 12 August 1949) is a former Australian politician. He was a Labor member of the Northern Territory Legislative Assembly. He had held his seat of Johnston since its creation at the 2001 election on 18 August 2001. He became a Minister in November 2002 and held a number of portfolios. From September 2010, he was Minister for Education and Training, Minister for Public and Affordable Housing, and Minister for Public Employment. Burns was also Leader of Government Business in the Legislative Assembly.

|}

Burns retired at the 2012 NT general election on 25 August 2012.

He is married with three children.

References

|-

1949 births
Living people
Members of the Northern Territory Legislative Assembly
Australian Labor Party members of the Northern Territory Legislative Assembly
Attorneys-General of the Northern Territory
21st-century Australian politicians